The Malicious Injuries to Property Act 1827 (7 & 8 Geo.4 c.30) was an Act of the Parliament of the United Kingdom. It was one of Peel's Acts, replacing the provisions abolished in the Criminal Statutes Repeal Act 1827 - both Acts came into effect on 1 July 1827. It applied only to England, not Scotland or Ireland (sections 42–43).

All those committing an offence under the Act could be apprehended without a warrant by the property's owner, his or her servant, anyone authorised by the owner or any "Peace Officer" (section 28). All its provisions applied whether or not it was committed from malice against the property's owner (section 25) and to principals in the first and second degrees and all accessories (section 26). Prosecutions were to be brought within three months of the offence (section 29). Any of its provisions from imprisonment could also be upgraded to hard labour (section 27). The Act also outlined the summoning of offenders (sections 30–31) and the administration of its punishments (sections 32–33), pardons, discharges, convictions and appeals under it (sections 34–39), record-keeping of convictions (section 40) and where and how such offences were to be tried (section 41).

It instituted the death penalty for maliciously setting fire to homes, workplaces, granaries and both Anglican and Dissenting churches and chapels (sections 2 and 8) and for setting fire to a ship, wrecking by false lights and destroying shipwrecked cargo (sections 9 and 11). However, damage to a ship by means other than fire (section 10) or damage to rivers, canals, harbours or sea defences (section 12) only brought imprisonment or transportation.

The Act also responded to the Luddites and their hostility to the Industrial Revolution and Agricultural Revolution, setting penalties of transportation or imprisonment for damaging textile goods and factory or farm machinery, with the addition of public or private whipping for male offenders (sections 3–4). Similar punishments were put in place for flooding or setting fire to coal mines and their associated machinery and structures, unless this was done accidentally in working a neighbouring mine (sections 5–7). It also covered damage to public bridges, turnpike gates and toll houses (sections 13–14), dams, fishponds and millponds (section 15), cattle, crops, hay, hops and fruit (sections 16–22) and fences, walls, stiles and gates (section 23). The Act also instituted compensation for offences to property not covered by its other sections (section 24).

References
Hansard

United Kingdom Acts of Parliament 1827